Coulee, or coulée ( or ) is a term applied rather loosely to different landforms, all of which refer to a kind of valley or drainage zone. The word coulee comes from the Canadian French coulée, from French couler 'to flow'.

The term is often used interchangeably in the Great Plains for any number of water features, from ponds to creeks.

In southern Louisiana the word coulée (also spelled coolie) originally meant a gully or ravine usually dry or intermittent but becoming sizable during rainy weather. As stream channels were dredged or canalized, the term was increasingly applied to perennial streams, generally smaller than bayous. The term is also used for small ditches or canals in the swamp.

In the northwestern United States, coulee is defined as a large, steep-walled, trench-like trough, which also include spillways and flood channels incised into the basalt plateau.

Types and examples

 The dry, braided channels formed by glacial drainage of the Scablands of eastern Washington, such as Grand Coulee and Moses Coulee.
 The furrowed moraines channeling rain runoff in the area east of the Missouri Coteau in the western United States and western Canada at the base of the Rocky Mountains.
 In the western United States, tongue-like protrusions of solidified lava, forming a sort of canyon. 
 In Wisconsin it is applied to valleys. These valleys tend to have high, steep walls. "Hollow" is used as a synonym, often for the smallest of such valleys. The term is also applied to the greater La Crosse, Wisconsin metropolitan area (i.e. the "Coulee Region").
 The Gassman Coulee in North Dakota may have been a contributing factor to the flooding of the Souris River in June 2011.

Geomorphology

Aside from those formed by volcanic eruptions, coulees are commonly canyons characterized by steep walls that have been shaped by erosion. These types of coulees are generally found in the northwestern United States and southwestern Canada. In the American west, rapid melting of glaciers at the end of the last ice age caused catastrophic flooding which removed bedrock by massive down-cutting erosion, forming deep canyons. Some coulees may be seasonally dry or contain small streams, however these small misfit streams do not have the magnitude of force necessary to form such expansive erosion. 

In Wisconsin, they are the product of nearly a half million years of erosion, unmodified by glaciation (see Driftless Area). The loose rocks at the base of the wall form what are called scree slopes. These are formed when chunks of the canyon wall give way in a rockslide. Left alone, the valleys are often woodland, with the ridgetops transitioning into tallgrass prairie when not turned into pasture or used for row crops.

Coulees provide shelter from wind and concentrated water supplies to plants which would otherwise struggle to survive in the xeric sagebrush steppe. Trees are often found in riparian habitats along streams in coulees and at the base of their walls.

See also

References

Fluvial landforms
Erosion landforms